Larry Long (born 1951 in Des Moines, Iowa) is an American singer-songwriter who has made his life work the celebration of everyday heroes. Author, historian, actor, film producer and broadcaster Studs Terkel called Larry “a true American Troubadour.”  His non-profit organization "Community Celebration of Place" encourages community building through music and intergenerational story-telling. He lives in Minneapolis, Minnesota.

An American troubadour
Larry Long's work is rooted in the troubadour tradition. Throughout his long career he has written and performed hundreds of ballads celebrating community builders and history makers.  While still in his early 20s, Long wrote a song for farmers fighting a high voltage power line Pope County Blues and traveled with a tractorcade of family farmers to Washington, D.C. to demonstrate for fair prices.  It was then he met Pete Seeger, who inspired him to organize the Mississippi River Revival, a decade-long campaign to clean up the Mississippi river. In 1989, he assembled the first hometown tribute to Woody Guthrie in Okemah, Oklahoma, which today has evolved into the annual Woody Guthrie Folk Festival with an array of established and upcoming artists.   In 2001 Long sang for Rosa Parks at the 45th anniversary of the Montgomery bus boycott.

Now a Smithsonian Folkways recording artist, Long has sung at major concerts and festivals throughout the United States and world, including Awesome Africa Festival (South Africa), Winnipeg Folk Festival (Canada) and at the Hollywood Bowl with Kris Kristofferson.  In May, 2009, he performed at Madison Square Garden with Joan Baez and others for Pete Seeger's 90th Birthday Celebration.  PBS broadcast the concert nationally as part of its Great Performances series.

Elders' Wisdom, Children's Song

In 1989, while working with communities in rural Alabama, Long created an intergenerational process called Elders' Wisdom, Children's Song. The program brings community elders into the classroom to share their life histories.  Based on these stories, the children create songs and lyrical work that celebrate the diverse and often unsung history makers of their community.

Long organized Community Celebration of Place, a non-profit organization committed to intergenerational and cross cultural community building. Through CCP Long has organized dozens of community-school collaborations in Minnesota and across the nation.  In song books and CDs Long has recorded the stories and music that have flowed from these collaborations.

Awards
Long has received numerous awards including the Bush Artist Fellowship (1995), the Pope John XXIII Award (2001, Viterbo University) and the Spirit of Crazy Horse Award (2002, Reclaiming Youth International). As a film producer, Longs work on the documentary Dodging Bullets—Stories from Survivors of Historical Trauma, has been awarded Best Documentary at the Minneapolis-St. Paul International Film Festival), the Bigfork International Film Festival, and the North Dakota Human Rights Film Festival awarded Dodging Bullets the Samuel Sprynczynatyk Storyteller Award: Best Documentary Feature.

Discography (partial listing)
 Sweet Thunder (1987, Flying Fish Records, produced with Billy Peterson).
Integrates music and spoken word with themes and stories from Dakota history and traditions.
 It Takes a Lot of People (1989, Flying Fish Records).
Okemah, Oklahoma's first hometown tribute for Woody Guthrie.
 Troubadour (1993, Flying Fish Records)
Featuring a live concert and field records from throughout the United States.
 Living in a Rich Man's World (1995, Rounder/Atomic Theory Recordings).
Anthology of Larry Long's work from 1976-1995.
 The Psalms (1992, Stellar Records).
Original works inspired by the Psalms.
 Hauling Freight, No Fences (1995, produced with Barry Kimm).
Documentary /music video.
 Here I Stand, Elders' Wisdom, Children's Song (1997, Smithsonian Folkways).
Features original works and field recordings with youth and elders from rural Alabama.
 Run For Freedom (1997, Flying Fish Records, produced by Marian Moore).
Songs from Long's work with children of the Lakota Nation.
 Well May the World Go (2000, Smithsonian Folkways)
Long is joined by a distinguished cast of fellow musicians to honor the immigrant cultures of the United States
 I Will Be Your Friend: Songs and Activities for Young Peacemakers (2006).
A CD with accompanying activity book distributed by the Teaching Tolerance Program of the Southern Poverty Law Center.
 Sacred Sites Songs (2007)
Compilation album supporting the promotion and documenting the efforts to bring respect and attention to America's sacred sites.
 Don’t Stand Still (2011, Cereus Records)
 Dove With Claws (2016, Cereus Records)
 Slow Night (2018, Cereus Records)

Songbooks and curriculum  (partial listing)
New Folk Favorites (Hal Leonard Publishing).
Elders' Wisdom, Children's Song Guidebook (Sing-Out Publishing, 1999).
I Will Be Your Friend: Songs and Activities For Young Peacemakers (Southern Poverty Law Center, 2003).
Be Kind to All That Live: Elders' Wisdom, Children's Song. Songbook, Volume 1 (Community Celebration of Place, 2006)
Just Be Who You Are: Elders' Wisdom, Children's Song. Songbook, Volume II (Community Celebration of Place, 2008)

References

Sources
 "Signing Out for Social Change," and "Larry Long, Pope County Blues," pp. 292 and 295 from Northern Lights: Stories of Minnesota’s Past, Jim Kenney. Minnesota Historical Society Press. 2003
 Deep Community: Adventures in the Modern Folk Underground, Scott Alarik, p. 131. Black Wolf Press. 2003
 "Four Part Harmony" p. 50-53 from The Compassionate Rebel: Energized by Anger, Motivated by Love, Bert E. Barlowe, p. 50-53. Triangle Park Creative Press. 2002
 Powerline: the First Battle of American’s Energy War, Senator Paul Wellstone and Barry M. Caspar, p. 24.  University of Massachusetts Press. 1983
 "Mississippi River Revival," pp. 319–330, by Sandra Grue, from Ringing in the Wilderness: The North Country Anvil, edited by Rhoda Gilman. Holly Cow! Press Press. 1995
 Featured interview with Larry Long, Sing Out! Magazine, V.33. No. 4, Summer 1988
 Consequential Learning: A Public Approach to Better Schools, Jack Shelton, pp. 91–100, New South Books. 2005
 Blue Guitar Highways, Paul Metsa, pp. 236–237.  University of Minnesota Press. 2011

External links
 Community Celebration of Place
 Larry Long homepage
 Larry Long albums at Smithsonian Folkways with Liner Notes
 Bringing Woody Guthrie Home
Interview with Larry Long about introducing kids to music, interviewed by Dave Carlson, All About Kids! TV Series #91 (1991)
Larry Long and 6th Grade Students from Frost Lake Magnet School in St.Paul present a Minnesota Folk Opera, "What Do I Call Home?", All About Kids! TV Series #94 (1991)

Living people
1951 births
American singer-songwriters
American social activists
Flying Fish Records artists